The Royal Marsden Hospital (RM) is a specialist cancer treatment hospital in London based in Kensington and Chelsea, next to the Royal Brompton Hospital, in Fulham Road with a second site in Belmont, close to Sutton Hospital, High Down and Downview Prisons. It is managed by the Royal Marsden NHS Foundation Trust.

History

Canon Row

The Royal Marsden was the first hospital in the world dedicated to the study and treatment of cancer. It was founded as the Free Cancer Hospital in 1851 by William Marsden at 1, Cannon Row, Westminster.  Marsden, deeply affected by the death of his wife Elizabeth Ann from cancer, resolved to classify tumours, research the causes and find new treatments. The hospital at first consisted solely of a dispensary and the drugs prescribed were palliative and aimed at treating symptoms, but it allowed William Marsden the opportunity to study and research the disease.

The hospital quickly outgrew its original premises as it became apparent that some patients required inpatient care. It moved locations several times during the 1850s until its benefactors decided to find a permanent solution.

Brompton site
Funds were raised to build a dedicated new building on a tract of land in Brompton along the Fulham Road. The design was by Messrs John Young & Son. The hospital was granted its Royal Charter of Incorporation by King George V in 1910 and became known as The Cancer Hospital (Free). This was subsequently changed by King Edward VIII to include the word ‘Royal’ and in 1954 the hospital was renamed The Royal Marsden Hospital in recognition of the vision and commitment of its founder.

Sutton site

When the National Health Service was formed, in 1948, the Royal Marsden became a post-graduate teaching hospital.  In response to the need to expand to treat more patients and train more doctors, a second hospital in Sutton, London was opened in 1962.

The original buildings on the Sutton site were first used as the Banstead Road branch of the South Metropolitan District School, which was a 'district' school for children of workhouse inmates in south London. In the 1890s, girls were kept at the Banstead Road site and boys were kept at a site in Brighton Road, which was built in 1851. The Brighton Road site later became Belmont workhouse and Belmont Psychiatric hospital, before being demolished in the 1980s. The Banstead Road site later became a sanatorium, before the southern half of the site was acquired by Royal Marsden in 1962.

Past physicians and surgeons
The surgeon William Ernest Miles was appointed to the hospital in 1899 and at the age of 60 was forced to retire, much against his will. In 1908, Thomas Horder, later raised to the peerage, was appointed as the hospital's first physician.

Professor of radiotherapy at the University of London, David Waldron Smithers, chaired the committee that constructed and established the Surrey branch of the Marsden, which was opened in 1963. He led radiation oncology at the hospital. The Royal Marsden's main lecture theatre is named in honour of consultant radiotherapist, Julian Bloom.

Services
The Royal Marsden provides care for people with cancers, as inpatients and outpatients, or as day care. It works in collaboration with The Institute of Cancer Research. 50,000 people are treated at the Royal Marsden every year.

Fire of 2008
On 2 January 2008, just before 1:30pm, a fire broke out in a plant room on the top floor of the hospital, which led to the evacuation of all patients and staff from the unit. The entire roof of the Chelsea Wing of the hospital was burned through, and the top floor was also affected. Five operating theatres and at least two wards were put out of action. The smoke was visible for miles around. In addition to the evacuation of 200 staff and outpatients, 79 inpatients - 37 of them bedded - were moved to a local church and the neighbouring Royal Brompton Hospital, some being carried on hospital mattresses by a team of emergency services and doctors.

Two patients were still undergoing surgery in the operating theatres in the basement and had to be evacuated. Later, full-care was resumed by RM medical staff who re-assembled on the wards of The Royal Brompton. A hospital official said that damage was less than thought and BBC reports the day after the fire stated that out-patients would be seen on the following Monday and that research documentation had not been lost. When the fire was at its peak, 125 firefighters and 16 ambulances were in attendance. Two members of staff suffered slight smoke inhalation but there were no other casualties or injuries. They were taken to the nearby Chelsea and Westminster Hospital A&E department. The outpatients department and radiotherapy unit reopened on Monday 7 January. Later that week, inpatients were admitted back to The Royal Marsden from their temporary location at The Royal Brompton. London Fire Brigade received 24 emergency calls reporting the fire. Over the period of the fire 111 fire appliances attended and 56 officers including the assistant commissioner.

See also
 List of NHS trusts
 Cancer in the United Kingdom

References

Further reading

External links

 
Organizations established in 1851
Cancer organisations based in the United Kingdom
1851 establishments in England
Royal Marsden Hospital
Hospital buildings completed in 1904
NHS hospitals in London
Cancer hospitals